Rosie Parks is a Chesapeake Bay skipjack built in Wingate, Maryland, in 1955 by Bronza Parks. She is owned by the Chesapeake Bay Maritime Museum (CBMM); her hailing port is Cambridge, Maryland. Rosie Parks was purchased by CBMM in 1975 from Orville Parks—the boatbuilder's brother—and she was the first skipjack to be preserved afloat by a museum. On November 2, 2013, Rosie Parks was relaunched after a three-year restoration. She is assigned Maryland dredge number 19.

References

External links

1955 ships
Ships built in Maryland